Chromatin assembly factor 1 subunit B is a protein that in humans is encoded by the CHAF1B gene.

Function 

Chromatin assembly factor I (CAF-1) is required for the assembly of histone octamers onto newly-replicated DNA. CAF-I is composed of three protein subunits, p50, p60, and p150. The protein encoded by this gene corresponds to the p60 subunit and is required for chromatin assembly after replication. The encoded protein is differentially phosphorylated in a cell cycle-dependent manner. In addition, it is normally found in the nucleus except during mitosis, when it is released into the cytoplasm. This protein is a member of the WD-repeat HIR1 family and may also be involved in DNA repair.

Interactions 

CHAF1B has been shown to interact with:
 ASF1A,
 ASF1B,  and
 BAZ1B.

References

Further reading

External links